Bell Bluff is a rock bluff on the west side of Beardmore Glacier, just north of the mouth of Garrard Glacier, Antarctica. It was named by the Advisory Committee on Antarctic Names for Charles A. Bell, Utilities Man, who wintered at Hallett Station in 1964.

References
 

Cliffs of the Ross Dependency
Shackleton Coast